Hacaritama Airport  is an airport serving the city of Aguachica in Cesar Department, Colombia.

Airlines and destinations

See also

 List of airports in Colombia
 Transport in Colombia

References

External links
HERE Maps - Hacaritama
OpenStreetMap - Hacaritama
OurAirports - Hacaritama

Airports in Colombia